This is a list of electoral results for the electoral district of Isis in Queensland state elections.

Members for Isis

Election results

Elections in the 1980s

Elections in the 1970s

Elections in the 1960s

Elections in the 1950s

Elections in the 1940s

Elections in the 1930s

 Preferences were not distributed.

References

Queensland state electoral results by district